Jabari Montsho Smith Sr. (born February 12, 1977) is an American former professional basketball player who played four seasons in the National Basketball Association (NBA).

Professional career
After a college career at Louisiana State University, he was selected by the Sacramento Kings in the second round of the 2000 NBA draft. He has played for the Kings, the Philadelphia 76ers and the New Jersey Nets over a span of 5 years, for a total of 108 games and averages of 3 points and 1.6 rebounds per game. His final NBA game was played in Game 4 of the 2005 Eastern Conference First Round on May 1, 2005 against the Miami Heat. In that game, Smith only played for 44 seconds (substituting at the very end of the 4th quarter for Vince Carter) and recorded no stats. The Nets would lose the game and get swept by Miami. In that first round series, Smith played in 3 games for a total of 3 minutes.

Smith also played in Spain, Turkey, Iran, Puerto Rico, and Mexico. He last played with Pioneros de Quintana Roo in Mexico.

Career statistics

NBA

|-
| style="text-align:left;"| 
| style="text-align:left;"| Sacramento
| 19 || 0 || 10.5 || .426 || — || .667 || .9 || .7 || .4 || .0 || 2.9
|-
| style="text-align:left;"| 
| style="text-align:left;"| Sacramento
| 12 || 0 || 5.9 || .286 || .000 || .500 || 1.2 || .5 || .2 || .3 || 1.5
|-
| style="text-align:left;"| 
| style="text-align:left;"| Sacramento
| 11 || 0 || 10.0 || .476 || .000 || .750 || 1.3 || .5 || .4 || .2 || 5.0
|-
| style="text-align:left;"| 
| style="text-align:left;"| Sacramento
| 31 || 0 || 5.4 || .371 || .000 || .600 || 1.0 || .4 || .1 || .2 || 2.1
|-
| style="text-align:left;"| 
| style="text-align:left;"| New Jersey
| 45 || 2 || 14.4 || .419 || .500 || .745 || 2.5 || .8 || .6 || .3 || 3.7
|- class="sortbottom"
| style="text-align:center;" colspan="2"| Career
| 108 || 2 || 9.8 || .413 || .125 || .690 || 1.6 || .6 || .3 || .2 || 3.0

Personal life
His son, Jabari Smith Jr., is an NBA player for the Houston Rockets. He played in college for the Auburn Tigers basketball team.

Smith's cousin Kwame Brown was selected as the first overall pick in the 2001 NBA draft.

References

External links

1977 births
Living people
20th-century African-American sportspeople
21st-century African-American sportspeople
African-American basketball players
American expatriate basketball people in Iran
American expatriate basketball people in Mexico
American expatriate basketball people in Spain
American expatriate basketball people in Turkey
American men's basketball players
Basketball players from Atlanta
Beşiktaş men's basketball players
CB Granada players
Centers (basketball)
Junior college men's basketball players in the United States
Liga ACB players
LSU Tigers basketball players
New Jersey Nets players
Philadelphia 76ers players
Pioneros de Quintana Roo players
Power forwards (basketball)
Sacramento Kings draft picks
Sacramento Kings players